Thomas Galbraith may refer to:

 Thomas Galbraith, 1st Baron Strathclyde (1891–1985), Scottish Unionist Party politician
 Tam Galbraith (Sir Thomas Galloway Dunlop Galbraith, 1917–1982), Scottish Unionist politician
 Thomas Galbraith, 2nd Baron Strathclyde (born 1960), British Conservative politician
 Thomas J. Galbraith (1825–1909), American politician
 Tommy Galbraith (1875–?), Scottish footballer